"Pictures of You" is a song by English rock band the Cure. It was released on 19 March 1990 by Fiction Records as the fourth and final single from the band's eighth studio album, Disintegration (1989). The song has a single version which is a shorter edit of the album version. There are also two different remixes on two UK 12-inch singles, and other singles released around the world, one of which later appeared on Mixed Up as the Extended Dub Mix and differs significantly from the album version in arrangement in that incorporates wholly original drum and bass arrangements. The other is an extended remix of the original album version which, at 7:59, runs slightly longer than the album version. There is also an edit which was released on 12-inch in the US, titled "extended remix" as in the European and Australasian releases, but which runs for 6:40 rather than 7:59.

According to interviews, the inspiration of the song came when a fire broke loose in Robert Smith's home. After that day, Smith was going through the remains and came across his wallet which had pictures of his wife, Mary. The cover of the single is one of the pictures. The same picture was used as the cover of the "Charlotte Sometimes" single, but that image was heavily warped and distorted.

In 2011, the song was voted number 283 on Rolling Stone's "The 500 Greatest Songs of All Time" list.

Music video
The Tim Pope–directed video was shot using three Super-8 cameras in Ballachulish, Scotland, during the February 1990 "week of the big snow", with Robert Smith mentioning that he had never been colder before.

Composition
The song is composed in the key of A major.

Covers
Angie Hart's version was used for a TAC (Transport Accident Commission) ad campaign to combat speeding drivers.
Lit covered the song for their 2004 eponymous album Lit.
Blankenberge made a version of the song and released it as their debut single in 2016.

Track listing
7-inch single (1)
 "Pictures of You" (Single edit) – 4:46
 "Last Dance" (live) – 4:42

7-inch single (2)
 "Pictures of You" (Single edit) – 4:46
 "Prayers for Rain" (live) – 4:48

12-inch single (1)
 "Pictures of You" (Extended version) – 8:07
 "Last Dance" (live) – 4:41
 "Fascination Street" (live) – 5:23

12-inch single (2)
 "Pictures of You" (Strange mix) – 6:45
 "Prayers for Rain" (live) – 4:48
 "Disintegration" (live) – 7:54

CD single
 "Pictures of You" (Single edit) – 4:46
 "Last Dance" (live) – 4:45
 "Fascination Street" (live) – 5:19
 "Prayers for Rain" (live) – 4:48
 "Disintegration" (live) – 7:54

CD single (2)
 "Pictures of You" (Single edit) – 4:46
 "Last Dance" (live) – 4:45
 "Fascination Street" (live) – 5:19

Charts

Personnel
Robert Smith – vocals, baritone guitar, keyboards, producer
Porl Thompson – guitar
Simon Gallup – bass
Boris Williams – drums
Roger O'Donnell – keyboards
Lol Tolhurst – credited with "other instrument"; does not actually play on this track
Bryan 'Chuck' New – remix

References

External links
 

1989 songs
The Cure songs
Songs written by Robert Smith (musician)
1990 singles
Fiction Records singles
Songs written by Boris Williams
Songs written by Simon Gallup
Songs written by Porl Thompson
Songs written by Lol Tolhurst
Songs written by Roger O'Donnell
Song recordings produced by David M. Allen
Gothic rock songs